Trespasser is, in the law of tort, property law and criminal law, a person who commits the crime of trespassing on a property.

Trespasser or variant may refer to:

 Trespasser (video game), a 1998 computer game made for Microsoft Windows
Dragon Age: Inquisition – Trespasser, a 2015 downloadable content expansion for Dragon Age: Inquisition
 HMS Trespasser (P312), British Royal Navy ship name
 HMS Trespasser (P312), British submarine
 The Trespasser (1929 film), a 1929 American pre-Code film
 The Trespassers, a 1976 Australian film
 The Trespasser (1947 film), a 1947 American action film
 The Gate II: Trespassers (1990 film), Canadian horror film
 Trespassers (album), 2010 Danish album by Kashmir
 The Trespasser (novel), 1912 novel by D.H. Lawrence
 "Trespassers" (Gotham), an episode of Gotham